William C. Greer (died August 6, 2001) was an American politician from Maryland. He served as a member of the Maryland House of Delegates from 1967 to 1974.

Early life
William C. Greer was born in Churchville, Maryland, to Annie Ethel (née Osborne) and Grover Cleveland Greer. He graduated from Bel Air High School, Mercersburg Academy and the University of Maryland. He played football with the Maryland Terrapins under Bear Bryant. He won the MacDonald Trophy. He was also part of the boxing and track teams.

Career
Greer served as a member of the Maryland House of Delegates, representing Harford County, from 1967 to 1974.

Greer owned Greer Transportation Company in Bel Air, Maryland. He also worked for the Maryland Department of Natural Resources.

Personal life
Greer married Mary Patricia Short. They had four sons and four daughters, William C. Jr., Michael, Timothy, John, Betsy, Patty, Marianne, Peggy. In retirement, Greer moved to Lancaster County, Pennsylvania. Greer founded a semi-pro football team and a Little League Team. He helped develop the Fair Hill Equestrian Center.

Greer died on August 6, 2001, at the age of 77, at St. Joseph's Hospital in Towson, Maryland. He was buried at Bel Air Memorial Gardens.

References

Year of birth missing
2001 deaths
People from Churchville, Maryland
Maryland Terrapins football players
Democratic Party members of the Maryland House of Delegates